Udea sheppardi is a moth in the family Crambidae. It was described by James Halliday McDunnough in 1929. It is found in North America, where it has been recorded from Idaho, Maine, New York, Newfoundland and Quebec.

References

sheppardi
Moths described in 1929